Stave may refer to:

Places 
 Stave (Krupanj), a village in Serbia
 Stave Hill, in London
 Stave Lake, in British Columbia, Canada
 Stave River, in British Columbia, Canada
 Stave Run, a river in Virginia, United States

Other uses 
 Stave (music), used in musical notation
 Stave (wood), of a barrel
 Stave bearing
 Stave church, a type of Medieval wooden church
 Bruce M. Stave (1937–2017), American historian
 Icelandic magical staves
 Joel Stave (born 1992), American football quarterback
 Stanza
 The Staves, an English folk rock trio
 Stave (game), played by the Ohlone people

See also
 Staff (disambiguation)